U'wa may refer to:
the U'wa people
the U'wa language